Read My Lips is a 2001 French film by Jacques Audiard, co-written with Tonino Benacquista. The film stars Vincent Cassel as Paul, an ex-con on parole, and Emmanuelle Devos as Carla, a nearly deaf secretary whose colleagues treat her disrespectfully, causing her to suffer. Despite their different backgrounds and initial fear of each other, they end up intimately related and helping each other.

Plot 

The film is set partially in the business offices and partially in the underworld of Paris. Carla, a lonely woman burdened by lack of respect from her co-workers and her only friend, Annie, begins to change after a younger man enters her life.

Carla is introduced immediately with a shot of her putting in her hearing aids. She is an overworked and under-appreciated secretary for a construction company, ridiculed behind her back by her co-workers who do not know she is deaf but despise her homely appearance and subservient position. After she faints from exhaustion she accepts the boss's offer to hire an intern to lighten her load.

The first applicant to be her assistant, Paul, is an ex-convict who is not technically qualified to be Carla's assistant, but she hires him. Paul's affable nature and "bad boy" spirit relieve Carla's loneliness and open up new possibilities for her. She rebuffs his initial clumsy sexual advances, but gradually they become a team, using creative but questionable methods to improve Carla's position at work.

Paul convinces her to help him – by using her lip-reading skills – to rob Marchand, a nightclub owner to whom he owes a lot of money and for whom he is working at night to pay off the debt. Reluctant at first, Carla becomes more intrigued as problems arise. After Paul fails to find the money, Carla finds it in Marchand's freezer and takes it to the car where she waits for Paul.

Marchand discovers the theft, thinks Paul stole the money, catches and beats him. Carla and Paul engineer his escape and the robbery's total success. As the movie ends, she instigates their making out for the first time in the car.

Cast
 Vincent Cassel : Paul Angeli  
 Emmanuelle Devos : Carla Behm
 Olivier Gourmet : Marchand  
 Olivia Bonamy : Annie
 Olivier Perrier : Masson
 Bernard Alane : Morel
  : Josie
 Pierre Diot : Keller
 François Loriquet : Jean-François
 Serge Boutleroff : Mammouth
 David Saracino : Richard Carambo
 Christophe Vandevelde : Louis Carambo
  : Le Barman
 Loïc Le Page : Quentin
 Nathalie Lacroix : L'Empoloyée ANPE
 Laurent Valo : Le jeune sourd du café
 Christiane Cohendy : Mathilde
 Isabelle Caubère : Jeanne
 Chloé Mons : Boubou
 Patrick Steltzer : Lehaleur
 Patrick Wintousky : Le chef de chantier
 Gladys Gambie : Danseuse n° 1
 Maurine Nicot : Danseuse n° 2
 Keena : Danseuse n° 3

Awards and nominations 
César Awards (France)
Won: Best Actress – Leading Role (Emmanuelle Devos) 
Won: Best Sound (Cyril Holtz and Pascal Villard) 
Won: Best Writing (Jacques Audiard and Tonino Benacquista)
Nominated: Best Actor – Leading Role (Vincent Cassel) 
Nominated: Best Cinematography (Mathieu Vadepied) 
Nominated: Best Director (Jacques Audiard) 
Nominated: Best Editing (Juliette Welfling) 
Nominated: Best Film
Nominated: Best Music (Alexandre Desplat)
European Film Awards
Nominated: Best Actress (Emmanuelle Devos) 
Nominated: Best Screenwriter (Jacques Audiard and Tonino Benacquista)
Nominated: Audience Award – Best Actor (Vincent Cassel)
Nominated: Audience Award – Best Actress (Emmanuelle Devos)
Newport Film Festival (USA)
Won: Best Actress (Emmanuelle Devos) 
Won: Best Director (Jacques Audiard)

See also

List of films featuring the deaf and hard of hearing

References

External links 

2001 films
2001 crime thriller films
2001 psychological thriller films
French crime thriller films
Films about deaf people
Films set in Paris
Films featuring a Best Actress César Award-winning performance
Films directed by Jacques Audiard
Films with screenplays by Jacques Audiard
Magnolia Pictures films
2000s American films
2000s French films
Films about disability